Leonese cuisine is a sub category of Spanish food that is considered to be very exotic and caloric.

Embutidos
Cecina from León is beef. In Leonese, cecina means "meat that has been salted and dried by means of air, sun or smoke". Cecina de León is made of the hind legs of beef, salted, smoked and air-dried in the province of León in northwestern Spain, and has protected designation of origin (PGI) status.

Botillo: Traditionally made in the western Leonese regions. Botiellu, in Leonese, is a dish of meat-stuffed pork intestine. It is a culinary specialty of El Bierzo, a county in the Spanish province of León and of the Portuguese region of Trás-os-Montes as well. This kind of embutido is a meat product made from different pieces left over from the butchering of a pig, including the ribs, tail and bones with a little meat left on them. These are chopped, seasoned with salt, pepper, garlic, and other spices, stuffed in the cecum of the pig, and partly cured via smoking. It can also include pork tongue, shoulder blade, jaw, and backbone, but never exceeding 20% of the total volume. It is normally consumed cooked, covered with a sheet. Also has a PGI status.

Wines
The area consists of numerous small valleys in the mountainous part (Alto Bierzo) and of a wide, flat plain (Bajo Bierzo). The DO covers 23 municipalities.
 León: in the southeast of the Province of León.

Sweets
 
 Hojaldres de Astorga
 Lazos de San Guillermo
 Cheeses
 Queisu de Valdión''

See also 

 León Province
 Castilian-Leonese cuisine
 Spanish cuisine
 List of Spanish dishes

References